Thomas Wallace may refer to:
 Thomas Wallace (Irish MP) (1765–1847), Irish politician, UK Member of Parliament
 Thomas Wallace, 1st Baron Wallace (1768–1844), British politician, President of the Board of Control and Vice President of the Board of Trade
 Thomas Browne Wallace (1865–1951), Member of Parliament for West Down, 1921–1922
 Thomas Fagan Wallace (1874–1951), agricultural chemist
 Thomas George Wallace (1879–1920), Canadian Member of Parliament for the Ontario ridings of York Centre and York West
 Thomas Seller Wallace (1896–1935), British-born Canadian police officer killed in the 1935 Royal Canadian Mounted Police Killings
 Thomas W. Wallace (1900–1943), Lieutenant Governor of New York in 1943
 Thomas Wallace (footballer) (1906–1939), English football defender
 Thomas Wallace (RAF officer) (1916–1944), South African World War II air ace
 Tom Wallace (born 1936), Australian politician
 Tommy Lee Wallace (born 1949), American film producer, director and screenwriter
 Thomas Wallace, drummer of Australian indie rock band Red Riders